Alena Hanušová (born 29 May 1991, Sokolov) is a Czech professional basketball player. She plays for the Czech Republic women's national basketball team and USK Praha. She has represented the national team in several Eurobasket Women competitions and represented country at the 2012 Summer Olympics.

References

Living people
Czech women's basketball players
1991 births
Basketball players at the 2012 Summer Olympics
Olympic basketball players of the Czech Republic
Power forwards (basketball)
People from Sokolov
Sportspeople from the Karlovy Vary Region